The 17th Metro Manila Film Festival was held in 1991.

Once again, MRN Film International's Ang Totoong Buhay ni Pacita M. romped away with eight awards in the 1991 Metro Manila Film Festival including the Best Picture, Best Actress for the seventh-time awardee Nora Aunor and Best Director for Elwood Perez among others. Meanwhile, FLT Film International's Juan Tamad at Mister Shooli sa Mongolian Barbeque (The Movie) received seven awards including the Best Actor for Eric Quizon, Best Supporting Actor for Leo Martinez as well as the festival’s Second Best Picture and the recipient of Gatpuno Antonio J. Villegas Cultural Awards.

Viva Films' Darna had four awards including the festival's Third Best Picture. The Best Child Performer went to Aiza Seguerra for Regal Films' Okay Ka, Fairy Ko!.

Entries

Winners and nominees

Awards
Winners are listed first and highlighted in boldface.

Special awards

Multiple awards

References

External links

Metro Manila Film Festival
MMFF
MMFF